Sud-Bandama Region is a defunct region of Ivory Coast. From 1997 to 2011, it was a first-level subdivision region. The region's capital was Divo and its area was 10,677 km². Since 2011, the area formerly encompassed by the region is divided between Bas-Sassandra and Gôh-Djiboua Districts.

Departments
At the time of its dissolution, Sud-Bandama Region was divided into three departments: Divo, Guitry, and Lakota.

Abolition
Sud-Bandama Region was abolished as part of the 2011 administrative reorganisation of the subdivisions of Ivory Coast. The area formerly encompassed by the region is divided between Bas-Sassandra and Gôh-Djiboua Districts. Fresco Department—which was carved out of Divo Department at the reorganisation—was combined with the former Bas-Sassandra Region to create Bas-Sassandra District. The remaining territory of Sud-Bandama became Lôh-Djiboua Region, one of two regions in Gôh-Djiboua District.

References

Former regions of Ivory Coast
States and territories disestablished in 2011
2011 disestablishments in Ivory Coast
1997 establishments in Ivory Coast
States and territories established in 1997